The Church of the Immaculate Conception is a Roman Catholic parish church under the authority of the Roman Catholic Archdiocese of New York, located at 754 Gun Hill Road, Williamsbridge, Bronx, New York City, New York. The parish was established in 1902–1903. The parish is currently run by Capuchin friars.

The third pastor (appointed in 1906), the Rev. Contantino Cassaneti was chaplain on the public work of the Croton Dam, and had the temporary chapels of St. Michael and St. Mary's erected at Peekskill Quarry, New York, on the suggestion of the contractor and builder J. J. Coleman.

Parish history
An Immaculate Conception parish church was around in 1892 for the German community, located at 151st Street, near Third Avenue. That, and other Immaculate Conceptions (on Manhattan's 14th Street and in Queens) are not connected with this parish.
"In December 1902, Cardinal Farley assigned to the Rev. Joseph Cirincione the task of organizing the parish of the Immaculate Conception for the Italians of this neighborhood." In November 1903, Rev. Patrick J. Lennon succeeded in the pastorate and began the work of building a church, which was contributed to by Cardinal Farley, Msgr. Lavelle, and the Jesuits of St. Ignatius and St. Francis Xavier. That first church structure "was dedicated October 8, 1905. It is situated on the corner of Maple and Briggs Avenues." In 1914, "the congregation numbers about 1,500, and the value of the church property is estimated at $23,000."

Buildings
On December 23, 1923, the previous structure burned. The present Italianate - Neo-Romanesque brick twin-towered church, across Gun Hill Road from the previous church, was built in 1925, designed by architect Joseph Ziccardi.

The rectory address is 754 East Gun Hill Road, Bronx NY 10467.

Priests
 Rev. Joseph Cirincione (1902-1903)
 Rev. Patrick J. Lennon (1903-1906)
 Rev. Contantino Cassaneti (March 25, 1906-?)
 Father John LoSasso ca. 1996 
 Father John Aurilia, present.

Immaculate Conception Catholic Elementary School
The parochial elementary school opened in 1950. As of 2011, it is staffed by fourteen Religious Sisters and lay faculty members. "The school offers a full curriculum from Early Childhood - Pre Kindergarten - Kindergarten to Grade Eight.... More than 95% of our graduates are accepted into the top Catholic High Schools of the Archdiocese or Charter High Schools in the city of New York."

References

External links
Official Website run by the Capuchin Brothers

Italian-American culture in New York City
Roman Catholic churches in the Bronx
Italianate architecture in New York City
Romanesque Revival church buildings in New York City
Private middle schools in the Bronx
1902 establishments in New York City
Catholic elementary schools in the Bronx
Williamsbridge, Bronx
20th-century Roman Catholic church buildings in the United States
Italianate church buildings in the United States